Bascote is a hamlet in rural Warwickshire, England. Population details can be found under Long Itchington. The nearest town is Southam, 1.5 miles away. Bascote consists of a small number of large houses, a post box and a telephone box. Nearby is Bascote Heath home to a few country mansions, facility, several country cottages, farms, a war memorial, and the Fox and Hen public house.

Environmental issues
The planned HS2 rail line will be under the Bascote Woods. There is also a planned solar farm.

External links

Villages in Warwickshire